Ben Selling (1852 or April 29, 1853 – 1931)  was a businessman, philanthropist, civil rights advocate, and politician in Portland, Oregon, United States. He was a noted leader in the Jewish community, and he owned a clothing store in downtown Portland.

Selling arrived in Portland with his family in circa 1862. He started with a boot and shoe business, then a clothing store. He was regarded as "the outstanding Jewish leader in Portland", receiving the first First Citizen Award from the Portland Realty Board in 1928. MacColl remarked the choice of Selling was ironic because he "possessed none of the acquisitive instincts ... associated with the realty trade." He also organized kitchens for the unemployed during the Panic of 1893 and Panic of 1907, serving over 450,000 meals. He heavily supported the Armenian Relief Society, bought $400,000 in Liberty Bonds during World War I, and supported the Waverly Baby Home and Jewish Neighborhood House, both in Portland. MacColl also stated "Suffice it to say, Ben Selling probably gave away more money in proportion to his income than any Oregon citizen since the state was founded."

He served on the Port of Portland Commission, then on the Portland Dock Commission. After being elected to the Oregon State Senate in 1910, he served as President of the Senate for one session in 1911. He was also Speaker of the Oregon House of Representatives for one session, 1915. He ran for the United States Senate in 1912, losing by a few hundred votes to Harry Lane.

After he died in 1931, four of his 40 employees sued his estate, saying he had promised the business to them. Their claims were rejected, as Selling was known for being honest and writing everything down.

See also
 Selling Building

References

External links 
 Selling Building, article from the Jewish Review
 Article from Business Journal on building renaming
 Ben Selling scholarship

1853 births
1931 deaths
Businesspeople from Portland, Oregon
Jewish American people in Oregon politics
Jews and Judaism in Portland, Oregon
Presidents of the Oregon State Senate
Speakers of the Oregon House of Representatives
Republican Party members of the Oregon House of Representatives
Philanthropists from Oregon